Petit-Vivy Castle is a castle in the former municipality of Barberêche (now part of Courtepin) in the Canton of Fribourg in Switzerland.  It is a Swiss Heritage Site of National Significance.

It is located near the dike surrounding the Schiffenensee and northeast of Barberêche. It is among the oldest preserved castles in the region. Around the keep are the remains of former surrounding walls, arranged in triangular form. The residential buildings were built in the 16th century.

See also
List of castles and fortresses in Switzerland

References

External links

Petit-Vivy Castle 

Castles in the canton of Fribourg
Cultural property of national significance in the canton of Fribourg